Inidhu Inidhu is a 2010 Indian Tamil language musical coming of age film directed by K. V. Guhan, starring eight newcomers in lead roles. It is a remake of the successful and award-winning 2007 Telugu film, Happy Days. It was produced by Prakash Raj under his banner, Duet Movies. It has music by Mickey J. Meyer, the composer of the original film, making his debut in Tamil. The film was released on 20 August 2010. Much of the shooting was done at VIT University, India.

Plot
Inidhu Inidhu depicts the happy college days of a group of undergraduate students. Freshmen Siddhu (Adith), Aravind alias Tyson (Narayan), Vimal (Vimal), Shankar (Shravan), Madhu (Reshmi), Aparna aka Appu and Jiya join an upmarket college in the city. Each of them comes from different states of the country. They are ragged by the seniors at the college which makes them bond with each other.

Eventually, Siddhu falls for Madhu, Tyson falls for his senior Sravanthi, fashionably called Shravs (Sonia), who is not receptive. The rest of the film is how the four couples get closer during their four-year course, peppered with pangs of jealousy, separated, reconciliation before going their separate ways upon graduation.

Cast
Adith as Siddharth (Siddhu)
Narayan as Arvind (Tyson)
Sharran as Shankar
Vimal Sarangan as Vimal
Sonia as Shravanthi (Shravs)
Reshmi as Madhubala (Madhu)
Benaas as Aparna (Appu)
Gia Umar as Sangeetha
Sunny Sawrav as Sanny Balboa
Krishna as Sanjay
Abhi Ram as Arjun
Ajay as Ajay
Abhishek Vinod as College senior
Anjala Zaveri as Shreya Madam (Guest Appearance)
Satish as Satish (Guest Appearance)

Soundtrack
The music was composed by Mickey J. Meyer and released by Sony Music India. The audio was launched on 1 August 2010, by Prakash Raj.

References

External links

Official website
Inidhu Inidhu at Facebook

Tamil remakes of Telugu films
2010s Tamil-language films
Films scored by Mickey J Meyer
Films directed by K. V. Guhan